The R449 road is a regional road in County Kildare, Ireland.

The 2 km section between Leixlip and the M4 is dual-carriageway. The speed limit along this section is 60 km/h, despite joining an 80 km/h road with 120 km/h road, via a dual carriageway.

The road crosses the Dublin to Sligo railway line and the Royal Canal. The bridge on which it crosses collapsed during construction, blocking the railway line for a time.

North to south the road leaves the R148 regional road (formerly the N4 national primary road until the opening of the M4), crosses the M4 and terminates at the R405 north of Celbridge.

See also
Roads in Ireland
National primary road
National secondary road

References

External links
Roads Act 1993 (Classification of Regional Roads) Order 2006 – Department of Transport

Regional roads in the Republic of Ireland
Roads in County Kildare